Mechnikov Peak is a prominent peak,  high, at the base of the spur separating Schussel Cirque and Grautskåla Cirque in the Humboldt Mountains of Queen Maud Land, Antarctica. It was discovered and plotted from air photos by the Third German Antarctic Expedition, 1938–39, and was mapped from air photos and surveys by the Sixth Norwegian Antarctic Expedition, 1956–60. The peak was remapped by the Soviet Antarctic Expedition, 1960–61, and named after Russian geographer L.I. Mechnikov, 1838–88.

References

Mountains of Queen Maud Land
Humboldt Mountains (Antarctica)